The 2007 Victorian Football League (VFL) is a semi-professional Australian Rules Football competition featuring twelve teams from Victoria and one team from Tasmania.

It was the 126th season of the Australian rules football competition.

The VFL Season is split into two sub-leagues, seniors and reserves.
Both leagues have the same teams, except for Tasmania and Geelong, who only play in the seniors league. The VFL Geelong team operates as a reserves team for the AFL team of the same name.

VFL season

Premiership season

Round 1

Ladder

Finals

Grand Final

Awards
The Jim 'Frosty' Miller Medal was won for the seventh time by Nick Sautner (Sandringham), who kicked 69 goals. Sautner's seventh time as the competition's leading goalkicker broke the record of six set by the medal's namesake, Jim 'Frosty' Miller (Dandenong). Sautner won a further two medals for a career total of nine before his retirement.
The J. J. Liston Trophy was by James Byrne (Geelong), who polled 22 votes. Byrne finished ahead of Shane Valenti (Sandringham), who was second with 20 votes, and Travis Ronaldson (Coburg), who was third with 17 votes.
The Fothergill-Round Medal was won by Shane Valenti (Sandringham).
Coburg won the reserves premiership. Coburg 17.20 (122) defeated Port Melbourne 8.8 (56) in the Grand Final, held as a curtain-raiser to the Seniors Grand Final on 23 September.

VFL Team of the Year

Notable events
During the final quarter of the Round 7 match between Tasmania and Coburg at Bellerive Oval, Tasmania's Mathew Westfield collided with one of the goal posts, snapping it at its base. The game was delayed for ten minutes while a replacement goal post was installed.
During the year, Frank Johnson, who played eight seasons for Port Melbourne from 1950 to 1957 and five for South Melbourne from 1960 to 1964, was inducted into the Australian Football Hall of Fame. He was the first player known primarily for his VFA career ever to be inducted into the Hall of Fame (excluding players from prior to the formation of the original VFL in 1897).
In the elimination final between North Ballarat and Bendigo, Bendigo held a 59 point lead early in the third quarter; North Ballarat then kicked 17 of the next 19 goals to record a 37 point win.

See also
 List of VFA/VFL premiers
 Australian Rules Football
 Victorian Football League
 Australian Football League
 2007 AFL season

References

External links
AFL Victoria website
TRUenergy VFL website
U18 TAC Cup website

Victorian Football League seasons
VFL